...So the Story Goes is the second solo studio album by Martha Davis, who is better known as the lead singer for the band The Motels.

Track listing

Personnel 

Musicians
Martha Davis – vocals, guitar, keyboards
Clint Walsh – lead guitar, rhythm guitar
Eric Gardner – drums, percussion (all tracks), glockenspiel (track 2)
Doug Lunn – bass (tracks 2, 4, 7 - 12), piano (tracks 4, 11)
Shon Sullivan – piano (tracks 5, 12), acoustic guitar (tracks 1 - 3, 5, 8, 12), keyboards (tracks 4, 9)
Paul Ill – bass (tracks 1, 5, 6)
David Sutton – acoustic bass (tracks 3, 4)
Kevin McCormick - bass (track 3)
Dana Colley – saxophones (tracks 5, 6), bass clarinet (tracks 3, 5, 12), melodica (track 12)
Jim Fitting – harmonica (track 2)

Production
Produced by Martha Davis
Executive Produced by David Paglia
Mixed & Engineered by Edmund Monsef
Mastered by Brian "Big Bass" Gardner

References 

2004 albums
Capitol Records albums
Martha Davis (rock singer) albums